Luis A. Echegoyen (born January 17, 1951) is a chemistry professor at the University of Texas at El Paso, and 2020 President of the American Chemical Society (ACS).

Background 
Echegoyen was born in Havana, Cuba, and received his B.S. and Ph.D. degrees in chemistry from the University of Puerto Rico, Río Piedras Campus. He has served as a professor of chemistry at Clemson University, University of Puerto Rico, University of Maryland, College Park, and University of Miami, and has been with UTEP since 2010. Echegoyen has also served as a Program Officer and later Director (2006–2010) for the National Science Foundation's division of chemistry.

In 2018, Echegoyen was chosen as the President-Elect of ACS, and began serving as President in 2020.

Research interests 
Echegoyen's research focuses on new materials, complexes of Fullerenes, recognition complexes, and self-assembly.

Community service 
Echegoyen has served on several prestigious committees, including the Alan T. Waterman award and Affiliate Member service to the International Union of Pure and Applied Chemistry. He has served in leadership roles in the Electrochemical Society.

Awards and honors 

 2011 – ACS Fellow
 2010 – Robert A. Welch Chair, UTEP
 2007 – Herty Medal
 2003 – Fellow of the American Association for the Advancement of Science

References 

1951 births
University of Texas faculty
People from Havana
Presidents of the American Chemical Society
American chemists
Living people